Odd Lie (14 December 1926 – 5 May 2015) was a Norwegian gymnast. He competed in eight events at the 1952 Summer Olympics.

References

1926 births
2015 deaths
Norwegian male artistic gymnasts
Olympic gymnasts of Norway
Gymnasts at the 1952 Summer Olympics
Sportspeople from Drammen